Blackmud Creek is a new residential neighbourhood in south west Edmonton, Alberta, Canada.

The neighbourhood is bounded on the west by the James Mowat Trail (111 Street), and on the north by Ellerslie Road.  To the east and south, the neighbourhood overlooks the Blackmud Creek Ravine.

The community is represented by the Blackmud Creek Community League, established in 2006, which unlike many other community leagues in Edmonton, does not maintain a community hall of its own.

Demographics 
>

Residential development 
Blackmud Creek is a neighbourhood that developed after the 2001 federal census.

According to the 2005 municipal census, the most common type or residence in the neighbourhood is the single-family dwelling.  These account for nine out of every ten (88%) residences in the neighbourhood.  The remaining residences are duplexes (7%) and apartment style condominiums in low-rise buildings with fewer than five stories.  Substantially all (96%) residences in the neighbourhood are owner-occupied.

Surrounding neighbourhoods

See also 
 Edmonton Federation of Community Leagues

References

External links 
 Blackmud Creek Neighbourhood Profile

Neighbourhoods in Edmonton